The black-throated huet-huet , (Pteroptochos tarnii) is a species of bird in the family Rhinocryptidae. It is found in southern/central Chile and adjacent western Argentina. Its natural habitat is temperate forest.

References

External links
Image at ADW

black-throated huet-huet
Birds of Chile
black-throated huet-huet
Taxonomy articles created by Polbot
Fauna of the Valdivian temperate rainforest